Sarhan may refer to:
 Monty Sarhan, a business executive
 Sarhan, Iran, a village in Bushehr Province, Iran
 Sarhan, Refahiye